Hugo von Kaweczynski was a German cinematographer.

Selected filmography
 Waterloo (1929)
 Peace of Mind (1931)
 Once There Was a Waltz (1932)
 Secret of the Blue Room (1932)
 The Hymn of Leuthen (1933)
 And Who Is Kissing Me? (1933)
 The Girl with the Bruise (1933)
 Model Wanted (1933)
 Three from the Unemployment Office (1933)
 The Page from the Dalmasse Hotel (1933)
 Marion, That's Not Nice (1933)
 Holiday From Myself (1934)
Peter, Paul and Nanette (1935)
 The Red Rider (1935)
 The Saint and Her Fool (1935)
 Hilde and the Volkswagen (1936)
 Der Etappenhase (1937)
 Little County Court (1938)
 Twilight (1940)

References

Bibliography
 Giesen, Rolf. Nazi Propaganda Films: A History and Filmography. McFarland, 2003.

External links

1883 births
Year of death unknown
Film people from Hamburg